The France national badminton team represents France in international badminton team competitions. It is controlled by the French Badminton Federation, France's governing body for badminton. France has had decent results in badminton, having reaching the semifinals in both men's and women's team at the 2020 European Men's and Women's Team Badminton Championships.

The mixed team were runners-up at the 2021 European Mixed Team Badminton Championships. The men's team also reached the quarterfinals in the Thomas Cup twice, particularly in 2014 and 2018. 

France also has decent results in badminton at the European Games, having won two silvers and two bronzes.

Participation in BWF competitions

Thomas Cup 

Uber Cup

Sudirman Cup

Participation in European Team Badminton Championships

Men's Team

Women's Team

Mixed Team

Participation in Helvetia Cup

Participation in European Junior Team Badminton Championships
Mixed Team

Current squad 
The following players were selected to represent France at the 2022 Thomas & Uber Cup.

Male players
Toma Junior Popov
Christo Popov
Arnaud Merklé
Alex Lanier
Fabien Delrue
William Villeger

Female players
Qi Xuefei
Léonice Huet
Yaëlle Hoyaux
Émilie Drouin
Anne Tran
Margot Lambert
Vimala Hériau
Flavie Vallet
Émilie Vercelot

References

Badminton
National badminton teams
Badminton in France